Kasie Enman (born September 9, 1979) is an American female mountain runner and ultra-marathoner.

Ultra career
Enman won individual bronze and team gold at the 2009 NACAC Cross Country Championships.

She won individual title at the 2011 World Mountain Running Championships.

In 2014, Enman won an event that was part of the Skyrunner World Series.

Marathon career
She is a multiple time winner of the Vermont City Marathon.

Coaching career
Enman is a coach at Champlain Valley Union High School.

Personal life
She attended Middlebury College.

References

Living people
American female ultramarathon runners
American female long-distance runners
American female marathon runners
American sky runners
American female mountain runners
1979 births
World Mountain Running Championships winners
21st-century American women